The 1994 Rugby League Premiership was the 20th end-of-season Rugby League Premiership competition.

The winners were Wigan.

First round

Semi-finals

Final

References

Rugby League Premiership